Cisthene calochroma is a moth of the family Erebidae. It was described by Snellen in 1878. It is found in Argentina.

References

Cisthenina
Moths described in 1878